Kuugaaluk (Inuktitut syllabics: ᑰᒑᓗᒃ) formerly Kogalu River is a river on the eastern coast of Baffin Island in the Qikiqtaaluk Region of Nunavut, Canada. The river outflows from Ayr Lake and travels  before reaching Baffin Bay.

See also
List of rivers of Nunavut
Geography of Nunavut

References

Rivers of Qikiqtaaluk Region